Ashton Wold is a  biological Site of Special Scientific Interest (SSSI) east of the market town Oundle in Northamptonshire. 

It is part of the Ashton Estate, which was purchased in 1860 by Lionel de Rothschild, a banker and politician. His grandson, Charles Rothschild, the founder of the Society for the Promotion of Nature Reserves, now The Wildlife Trusts, managed the Ashton Wold estate to maximise its suitability for wildlife, especially butterflies. He built Ashton Wold House, which was designed by William Huckvale. The house and its garden are listed on the Register of Historic Parks and Gardens by English Heritage for their historic interest, and part of the garden is woodland which is designated as Ashton Wold SSSI. 

Part of the estate is the subject of a Restrictive Covenant between Charles's daughter Miriam Rothschild and the National Trust in 1945. Following Charles death in 1923 his wife, Rozsika and their daughter Miriam Rothschild inherited the estate. Miriam pressed the UK Government to allow more German Jews as refugees from Nazi Germany and set up housing for 49 Jewish children. During World War II Ashton Wold estate served as a hospital for wounded military personnel, including Miriam's future husband, Captain George Lane. It also provided accommodation blocks in the Ashton Wold woods for the RAF and the American Eighth Air Force billeted at nearby Polebrook Airfield. 

The Ashton Estate comprises residential properties, holiday accommodations (The Lady Rothschild Holiday Houses), agricultural land and a working farm. The current host of The Lady Rothschild Holiday Houses is Dr Charles Daniel Lane. Dr Lane enjoyed an outstanding career as a molecular biologist who along with colleagues Gerard Marbaix and John Gurdon discovered the oocyte exogenous mRNA expression system.

Ecology
The SSSI is ancient secondary woodland with mature oak, ash and birch trees. The thick shrub layer includes hawthorn and buckthorn. There are breeding birds such as woodcocks and hawfinches.

Access
There is access from Lutton Road.

References

Sites of Special Scientific Interest in Northamptonshire